The Federation of Genealogical Societies was a 501(c)(3) non-profit corporation founded in January 1976 and headquartered in Austin, Texas. FGS links hundreds of U.S.-based genealogy societies and their members. FGS merged with the National Genealogical Society in 2020.

To do this, FGS publishes FORUM magazine, filled with articles pertaining to society management and genealogical news. FGS also publishes an extensive series of "Society Strategy Papers", covering topics about effectively operating a genealogical society.

FGS sponsored an annual conference with four days of lectures, including one full day devoted to society management topics.

References

External links 

 Official
 

501(c)(3) organizations
1976 establishments in Texas
Genealogical
Genealogical societies in the United States
Organizations established in 1976

Non-profit organizations based in Texas